Lynn Elizabeth Eberly is a professor of biostatistics in the School of Public Health at the University of Minnesota, whose research involves longitudinal studies, medical imaging, and other forms of correlated data.

Early life
Eberly double-majored in mathematics and German language and literature at Washington University in St. Louis, graduating in 1991. She earned her Ph.D. in statistics from Cornell University in 1997, under the supervision of George Casella,

Career
After graduating from Cornell, she joined the University of Minnesota faculty the same year.

With professor Chap T. Le she is co-author of the textbook Introductory Biostatistics (2nd ed., Wiley, 2016).

In 2014 she was elected as a Fellow of the American Statistical Association "for excellence in statistical methodology related to correlated and medical imaging data; for broad impact in collaborative research and statistical consultation; for leadership in biostatistical core grant and data coordinating center activities; for excellence and innovation in teaching; and for diligence in service to the ASA, her university, and the profession."

References

Year of birth missing (living people)
Living people
American women statisticians
Biostatisticians
Washington University in St. Louis alumni
Cornell University alumni
University of Minnesota faculty
Fellows of the American Statistical Association